Francis Whitworth  (9 May 1684 – 6 March 1742), of Leybourne, Kent and Blackford, near Minehead, Somerset, was a British politician who sat in the House of Commons from 1723 to 1742.

Whitworth was the sixth son of Richard Whitworth of Batchacre Park, in Adbaston, Staffordshire and his wife Anne Mosley, daughter of Rev. Francis Mosley of Wilmslow, Cheshire. He was educated at Westminster School in 1701. Around 1720, he married  Joan Windham of Clarewell, Gloucestershire.

Whitworth was appointed to a sinecure post as Secretary for Barbados in 1719. At the 1722 general election he stood for Parliament at  Minehead being assured by Lord Carteret that the government would  support him.  He was defeated in a fierce contest, but when he presented a petition, he was persuaded to withdraw it.  He was returned  as Member of Parliament for Minehead at a by-election 24 May 1723.   In 1724 he acquired the  Grange, Castle and Manor of Leybourne in Kent.   He retained the Minehead seat in 1727, and when a petition was raised against him the government  prevented its being heard.  About this time he strengthened his interest by buying an estate of Blackford near Minehead.   He also applied for his son to be granted  the reversion of the secretary of Barbados, claiming  that George I had consented to this but had died before he had signed the warrant. This application was unsuccessful and he retained the post for the rest of his life.

Whitworth made his first recorded Parliamentary speech, in support of the Hessian troops, on 3 February 1731. In 1732 he obtained the post of Surveyor of Woods and Forests North and South of Trent worth £1,000 a year and he held it for the rest of his life.  He was  active in the interests of his constituents, particularly when they were threatened by commercial competition from Ireland and the colonies. On 12 April 1732 he spoke against a proposal to remove the duty on Irish yarn, and on 10 March 1732 he successfully moved for a bill to stop the free of duty importation of hops from New England into Ireland.  He spoke on the Charitable Corporation bill on 15 May 1732; seconded the army vote, and was abused  by the mob outside the House on the withdrawal of the Excise Bill.  On 10 May 1733 he opposed a petition from the trustees for Georgia for more money.as  he was against the enlargement of colonies, and ‘wished New England at the bottom of the sea.’ He was returned unopposed at the 1734 general election. 
He made his last recorded speeches, in 1734 and 1735, which were concerned with  local interests at Minehead. He was returned unopposed in 1741 but was frequently absent, probably on account of illness.

Whitworth died on 6 March 1742 leaving one son Charles. He was the younger brother of Charles Whitworth, 1st Baron Whitworth.

References

1684 births
1742 deaths
Members of the Parliament of Great Britain for English constituencies
British MPs 1722–1727
British MPs 1727–1734
British MPs 1734–1741
British MPs 1741–1747